Shuko, Shūko or Shuuko (written: 周子, 修子 or 柊子) is a feminine Japanese given name. Notable people with the name include:

, Japanese actress and lyricist
Shuko Akune (born 1959) American actress
, Japanese tennis player
, Japanese actress

Shūkō or Shuukou (written: 修功) is a separate masculine Japanese given name, though it may also be romanized the same way. Notable people with the name include:

, Japanese anime director and animator

Fictional Characters
Shūko Komi, a character from Komi Can't Communicate

See also 

 Schuko

Japanese feminine given names
Japanese masculine given names